Catherine Goulet is an author, publishing entrepreneur, and careers expert from Vancouver, British Columbia, Canada.

Career

Goulet is co-founder and chairperson of the Next Generation Indie Book Awards, a literary awards program for independently published books. She has said that one of her goals is to make the awards "the Sundance of indie books". Goulet herself is author of more than four books focused on breaking into different careers and she has written on work-related topics for international press titles including Metro News and CNN.

Alongside her sister Tag, Goulet co-authored a book called Dream Careers which reached number #1 on Amazon's career and business list, and attracted the attention of ABC, Oprah Winfrey, Woman's Day and The Wall Street Journal.

Personal life

Goulet, who is Metis, is the daughter of best-selling author Terry Goulet and George R. D. Goulet, a notable historian and author, and the sister of Tag Goulet, her business partner at FabJob.

References

External links
FabJob website
Next Generation Indie Book Awards website

Catherine Goulet
Canadian publishers (people)
Year of birth missing (living people)
Living people
21st-century Canadian non-fiction writers
21st-century Canadian women writers
Canadian Métis people